The 2015 season was Aalesunds FK's ninth consecutive season in the Tippeligaen. They finished the season in 10th position, whilst also reaching the Third Round of the Norwegian Cup, where they were defeated by Hødd.

Aalesunds started the season with new manager Harald Aabrekk, but on 28 April, Aabrekk was sacked and replaced by Trond Fredriksen.

Squad

Out on loan

Transfers

Winter

In:

Out:

Summer

In:

Out:

Friendlies

Competitions

Tippeligaen

Results summary

Results by round

Results

Table

Norwegian Cup

Squad statistics

Appearances and goals

|-
|colspan="14"|Players away from Aalesunds on loan:

|-
|colspan="14"|Players who appeared for Aalesunds no longer at the club:

|}

Goal scorers

Disciplinary record

References

Aalesunds FK seasons
Aalesunds